John Bolt may refer to:
 John F. Bolt (1921–2004), naval aviator in the United States Marine Corps
 John Bolt (theologian), American-Dutch Reformed theologian
 John Bolt (rower) (born 1956), Australian rower
 Jay Bolt (John Ashley Bolt, born 1994), American soccer player